Darreh Bidad-e Olya (also Romanized as Darreh-ye Bīdād-e ‘Olyā; also known as Darreh Bīdād and Darreh Bīdād-e Bālā) is a village in Shirvan Rural District, in the Central District of Borujerd County, Lorestan Province, Iran. At the 2006 census, its population was 57, in 11 families.

References 

Towns and villages in Borujerd County